The United States Senate has the authority for meeting in closed session, as described in the Standing Rules of the Senate.  

The Continental Congress and Constitutional Convention met in secret. The Senate met in secret until 1794. The Senate’s executive sessions
(such as nominations and treaties) were not opened until 1929.

Standing Senate Rules XXI, XXIX, and XXXI cover secret sessions for legislative and executive business (nominations and treaties).  Rule XXIX calls for Senate consideration of treaties to be conducted in secret unless a majority votes to lift the “injunction of secrecy,” which it usually does.  Rule XXXI mandates that all nominations be considered in open session unless the Senate votes to do so in secret.  Rule XXI calls for the Senate to close its doors once a motion is made and seconded.  The motion is not debatable, and its disposition is made behind closed doors.  All of a chamber’s normal rules of debate apply during secret sessions, except during impeachment deliberations in the Senate.

For Senate impeachment proceedings, Rules XX and XXIV of the Senate Rules for Impeachment Trials govern secret deliberations.  The Senate has interpreted these rules to require closed deliberations during impeachment trials. 

The proceedings of a secret session are not published unless the Senate votes, during the meeting or at a later time, to release them. Then, those portions released are printed in the Congressional Record.  If the Senate does not approve release of a secret session transcript, the transcript is stored in the Office of Senate Security and ultimately sent to the National Archives and Records Administration. The proceedings remain sealed until the Senate votes to remove the injunction of secrecy.

These sessions have been held 57 times since 1929.  The following is a full list of those sessions, along with their dates and the reasons they were called:

See also
Closed sessions of the United States House of Representatives

Notes

References
Amer, Mildred (2004). "Secret Sessions of Congress: A Brief Historical Overview". Retrieved Nov. 5, 2005.
Amer, Mildred.  (Nov. 3, 2005). "Secret Sessions of the House and Senate" Congressional Research Service.  98-718 GOV.
Dickerson, John (Nov. 1, 2005). "Dirty Harry". Slate.
Engber, Daniel (Nov. 2, 2005). "The XXI Club". Slate.

 

United States government secrecy
United States Senate